The Intercity Express is an express-train service in India which connects major railway junctions and state capitals. These act as long-distance reserved and unreserved suburban trains with sitting accommodation (AC Chair Car - CC and Second Sitting - 2S). These are quite fast and maintain a high average speed for short distances along with priority over other trains.

History
The first named intercity train (Flying Ranee) was introduced in 1906 for providing connections between two cities from one state to other various states in India. The train left Surat station for Mumbai Central station to cover a distance of 264 km in 5 hrs 28 min and ran weekly from 1906 to 1939 when it was discontinued due to World War II. Since then, it has been discontinued and restarted several times. It finally resumed operations on 1 November 1950 and has been running ever since.

The Mumbai CSMT–Pune Deccan Queen Express, the second named intercity train in India, was introduced on 15 February 1930.

On 1 July 1992, the first intercity express was introduced between Indore and New Delhi which is the only overnight intercity train runs between two major cities of India. 

On 1 July 1997, the second intercity express train launched between Chennai–Coimbatore & Bengaluru–Hubbali which was the first one-day trip daily intercity express train.

Features

The trains are less expensive than other express trains and usually reach their destinations within 5–6 hours. They usually complete a round trip in a day, returning to the origin station at night and using only a single rake. Generally, they have only sitting accommodations and a pantry car. Intercity-Express trains run daily, except:

Madan Mahal–Ambikapur Intercity Express runs daily (on starting it runs only three days a week)
Jabalpur–Indore Intercity Express, three days a week
Bhopal–Gwalior Intercity Express, five days a week
Indore–New Delhi Intercity Express, which takes 11 hours to cover the  route. This train uses two rakes and also has unreserved, sleeper service and three coach classes
Bengaluru–Ernakulam intercity express also uses 2 rakes
Mangaluru–Coimbatore Intercity Express uses 2 rakes and which is shared with Ernad Express
Haldibari–Kolkata Intercity Express runs tri-weekly covering 630 km in 11 hours 10 minutes. It has Chair Car & AC Chair Car Coaches. The train is Superfast in nature.
Katihar–Patna Intercity Express runs except Sunday.

Named Intercity trains
The following trains are intercity-express trains, but have different names:

Normal Intercity Express trains
Intercity Express routes are (round-trip, unless noted):

Incidents
On 13 Feb 2015, at least 9 passengers were dead and over 100 passengers were injured when the Bangalore City–Ernakulam Intercity Express derailed between Anekal Road and Hosur on Bangalore City–Salem section which lies between the border of Karnataka and Tamil Nadu State, In suspected some technical issue in the engine. The train was heading towards Ernakulam. 

On 30 January 2016, Ratnachal Express (12717) from Vishakhapatnam to Vijayawada was burnt in protest of reservation for Kapu community leaving no one injured according to the railway sources.

See also 
 Duronto Express
 List of named passenger trains in India
 Rajdhani Express
 Shatabdi Express
 Express trains in India
 Rajya Rani Express

References

External links
List of Indian Intercity Express Trains